The Welsh Open is a professional ranking snooker tournament that has been held annually since 1992. It replaced the Welsh Professional Championship, which ran annually from 1980 to 1991 and was open only to Welsh players. The Welsh Open is now the longest running ranking event after the World Championship and the UK Championship. Since the 2016–17 season, it has been one of four tournaments in the Home Nations Series, alongside the Northern Ireland Open, the Scottish Open, and the English Open. Since 2017, the winner of the event has received the Ray Reardon Trophy, named after the Welsh six-time world champion. Reardon himself presented the newly named trophy to 2017 winner Stuart Bingham.

Mark Williams is the only Welsh winner, having captured the title in 1996 and 1999. John Higgins holds the record for the most Welsh Open wins, claiming the title five times.

Robert Milkins is the reigning champion.

History 
The tournament began as a ranking tournament in 1992. It is now the third-longest-running ranking event on the World Snooker Tour, after the World Championship and the UK Championship. In the 2016–17 season, the event became part of the Home Nations Series, alongside the Northern Ireland Open, the Scottish Open, and the English Open. The event trophy was renamed the Ray Reardon Trophy; Reardon himself presented the first trophy bearing his name to the 2017 winner Stuart Bingham.

The event was sponsored by Regal until 2003, but UK restrictions on tobacco advertising meant that it was without a sponsor until 2009. The tournament was sponsored by Totesport.com in 2010, by Wyldecrest Park Homes in 2011, by 888真人 in 2012, and by BetVictor from to 2013 to 2016. In 2017 the tournament was sponsored by Coral. 

In 1996, Paul Hunter reached the semi-finals at the age of 17 years and 111 days, becoming the youngest player to reach this stage of a ranking tournament.

John Higgins holds the record for the most Welsh Open titles, having won the event on 5 occasions. The other multiple winners are Ronnie O'Sullivan with 4 victories, Stephen Hendry with 3, and Steve Davis, Ken Doherty, Paul Hunter, Mark Williams and Neil Robertson with 2 wins each.

Like the Welsh Professional Championship, it was played at the Newport Centre in Newport, before moving to the Cardiff International Arena in 1999. It was moved back to Newport in 2005, where it remained until 2014. In January 2014, World Snooker chairman Barry Hearn announced that the 2014 tournament would be the last held in Newport, and that he would open negotiations to move the event to a larger venue, most likely in Cardiff. The event was held at the Motorpoint Arena in Cardiff from 2015 to 2020, before moving back to Newport in 2021 and 2022. The 2023 event will be held in Llandudno, the first time in its history that it has been staged in neither Newport nor Cardiff. The tournament is broadcast by BBC Wales, Eurosport, CCTV, SMG, Now TV and Showtime Arabia. In the early days it was televised by both BBC Wales (in English), S4C (in Welsh) and Sky Sports.

There have been nine maximum breaks in the history of the tournament. The first was made by Ronnie O'Sullivan in 1999, against James Wattana. The second was made at the qualifying stage of the 2000 event by Barry Pinches, against Joe Johnson. The third was made by Andrew Higginson in 2007, against Ali Carter. The fourth 147 was made in 2011 by Stephen Hendry, against Stephen Maguire. This was Hendry's 10th 147 break, and with this he equalled the record for most maximums with Ronnie O'Sullivan. He also became the oldest player at the time to compile a maximum break at the age of 42 years and 35 days. The fifth maximum was made by O'Sullivan in 2014, in the last frame of the final against Ding Junhui. This was O'Sullivan's 12th 147 break, and with it he set the record for most maximums. It was also the last maximum to be compiled before the event moved to Cardiff. Ding Junhui made the sixth at the quarter-finals of the 2016 tournament, against Neil Robertson. Two maximum breaks were made at the 2019 event, one by Neil Robertson in the first round, against Jordan Brown, and one by Noppon Saengkham in the third round, against Mark Selby. The most recent maximum break was made in 2020 by Kyren Wilson on his first visit to the table in his first round match against Jackson Page.

Winners

Statistics

Finalists

 2023 competitors are shown in bold.

See also
Welsh Professional Championship

References

 

Recurring sporting events established in 1992
1992 establishments in Wales
Snooker ranking tournaments
Snooker competitions in Wales
Sport in Newport, Wales
Sports competitions in Cardiff
Winter events in Wales